Gunnar Randal Henderson (born June 29, 2001) is an American professional baseball shortstop and third baseman for the Baltimore Orioles of Major League Baseball (MLB).

Early life and amateur career
Henderson was born in Montgomery, Alabama and grew up in Selma, Alabama, where he attended John T. Morgan Academy and played basketball and baseball. Henderson committed to play college baseball at Auburn University during his sophomore season. As a senior in 2019, he was named the Alabama Player of the Year after batting .559 with 17 doubles, nine triples, 11 home runs, 69 runs scored and 75 RBIs while stealing 32 bases. Henderson was also named the Alabama Independent School Association Player of the Year in basketball after averaging 17 points and 11 rebounds per game.

Professional career
The Baltimore Orioles selected Henderson in the second round of the 2019 Major League Baseball draft with the 42nd overall pick. Henderson signed with the club for a $2.3 million signing bonus. After signing, he was assigned to the rookie-level Gulf Coast League Orioles. Henderson finished his first professional season with a .259 batting average, one home run, and 11 RBIs. 

After the 2020 minor league season was canceled due to the COVID-19 pandemic, Henderson was added to the Orioles' alternate training site midway through the Major League season and then took part in the team's fall Instructional League. Henderson was named the best overall athlete in the Orioles' minor league system going into the 2021 season. He began the season with the Low-A Delmarva Shorebirds and was promoted to the High-A Aberdeen IronBirds and the Double-A Bowie Baysox during the year. Over 105 games between the three teams, he slashed .258/.350/.476 with 17 home runs, 74 RBIs, 28 doubles and 16 stolen bases. 

Henderson began the 2022 season at Bowie. He entered the season as a consensus top-100 prospect across baseball. Henderson batted .312/.452/.573 in 157 at bats with eight home runs and 35 RBIs with 41 runs scored in 47 games for the Baysox before being promoted to the Triple-A Norfolk Tides. On June 28, 2022, the day before his 21st birthday, he hit for cycle in a 8-2 win over the Gwinnett Stripers. Henderson was selected to represent the Orioles at the 2022 All-Star Futures Game.

The Orioles selected Henderson's contract on August 31, 2022, and promoted him to the active roster. He made the starting roster later that day, in a game against the Cleveland Guardians. His first major league hit occurred that same day resulting in a home run. Henderson batted .259 with four home runs and 18 RBIs in 34 games with the Orioles in 2022.

References

External links

2001 births
Living people
Aberdeen IronBirds players
Baltimore Orioles players
Baseball players from Montgomery, Alabama
Bowie Baysox players
Delmarva Shorebirds players
Gulf Coast Orioles players
Major League Baseball shortstops
Norfolk Tides players